Alfred Guth (27 July 1908 – 13 November 1996) was an Austrian water polo player, swimmer, and modern pentathlete. At the 1932 Maccabiah Games in Mandatory Palestine, in swimming he won a gold medal and two silver medals. He competed at the 1936 Summer Olympics, coming in 33rd in modern pentathlon. A Holocaust survivor, he emigrated to the United States after WWII, competed in Masters swimming, and established 41 U.S. Masters Swimming age-group records.

Biography

Austria
In 1924 and 1925, swimming for the Jewish sports club Hakoah Vienna, Guth won the Quer Durch Wien (“Across Vienna”) 7.5 km race in the Danube.

Guth competed for Austria at the 1927 Men's Water Polo European Championship in Bologna, Italy, in which the team came in 6th.

Guth competed in swimming at the 1932 Maccabiah Games in Mandatory Palestine. He won a gold medal in the 1,500m freestyle, a silver medal in the 400m freestyle, and a silver medal as part of Team Austria in the 4x200m freestyle.

He competed at the 1936 Summer Olympics, coming in 33rd in modern pentathlon. Guth placed highest in swimming, where he came in 5th, ahead of all three medalists.

United States
Guth was a Holocaust survivor, and emigrated to the United States.

In the US, Guth lived in San Pedro, California, and competed in Masters swimming. He established 28 individual and 13 relay U.S. Masters Swimming age-group records between 1972 and 1987. He was a Masters All American in 1974 and 1977 (65-69), 1978-79 and 1981-83 (70-74), 1983-87 (75-79), and 1988-89 (80-84).

References

External links
 

1908 births
1996 deaths
20th-century Austrian Jews
20th-century American Jews
American male modern pentathletes
American male swimmers
American male water polo players
Austrian male modern pentathletes
Austrian male swimmers
Austrian water polo players
Competitors at the 1932 Maccabiah Games
Holocaust survivors
Jewish American sportspeople
Jewish Austrian sportspeople
Jewish emigrants from Austria to the United States after the Anschluss
Jewish water polo players
Jewish swimmers
Jewish sportspeople
Jews and Judaism in Vienna
Olympic modern pentathletes of Austria
Modern pentathletes at the 1936 Summer Olympics
Maccabiah Games gold medalists for Austria
Maccabiah Games silver medalists for Austria
Maccabiah Games medalists in swimming
Masters swimmers
People from San Pedro, Los Angeles
SC Hakoah Wien
Sportspeople from Vienna
Swimmers from Los Angeles
Swimmers from Vienna